Ballyfermot is a suburb of Dublin, Ireland. It is located seven kilometres (5 miles) west of the city centre, south of Phoenix Park. It is bordered by Chapelizod on the north, by Bluebell on the south, by Inchicore on the east, and by Palmerstown and Clondalkin on the west. The River Liffey lies to the north, and the Grand Canal, now a recreational waterway, lies to the south of  Ballyfermot. Ballyfermont lies within the postal district Dublin 10. Cherry Orchard, which is also a suburb, is sometimes considered to be within Ballyfermot.

Ballyfermot is also known as a civil parish in the barony of Uppercross.

Toponymy
The place name Ballyfermot—rendered in Irish Baile Formaid and sometimes Baile Thormaid—is derived from the Middle Irish baile ("farmstead"), and the Old Norse personal name Þormundr. It is also referred to colloquially by Dubliners as Ballyer for short.

History 
The 12th century saw the Cambro-Normans expand west across the Irish Sea from Pembroke in Wales into Leinster. After the Treaty of Windsor in 1175, through feudal land grants and intermarriage, the Cambro Norman knights came into possession of land in south and west Dublin, along with the local Irish chieftain who supported them, Mac Giolla Mocolmog. Family names associated with the area at this time included Mac Giolla Mocolmog (FitzDermot), O'Cathasaidhe, Fitzwilliam, Le Gros (Grace), O'Dualainghe, Tyrrell, O'Hennessy, O'Morchain, Dillon, O'Kelly, De Barneval (Barnewall), and Newcomyn (Newcomen).

In 1307 the manor of Ballyfermot was held by William Fitzwilliam and his wife Avice, who leased part of it to Thomas Cantock, the Lord Chancellor of Ireland. The land passed from the Fitzwilliams to their relatives, the Clahulls from Dundrum, and later to the Barnawalls of Drimnagh Castle.

Ballyfermot Castle was constructed on the site of a Norman motte and baily. Located northwest of the intersection of Le Fanu and Raheen Roads, it was the centre of the Upper (west) and Lower (east) Ballyfermot townships. Built in stone by Wolfram De Barneval in the fourteenth century, it was a stronghold against the formidable O'Byrnes and O'Tooles. These aboriginal Gaelic families had been discommoded from their lush home-farms around Naas. They were driven south into the wooded Dublin hills. Unlike their intermarried Mac Giolla Mocolmog relatives, now called FitzDiarmuid, they had not integrated into the evolving Hiberno-Norman society. They frequently raided, rustled and burned local bawn enclosures from their inaccessible hillside encampments beyond Brittas and Bohernabreena.

The Castle was inherited by Robert Newcomen, who enhanced it and held it into the mid-seventeenth century. Its political importance subsequently declined with the Newcomens, culminating with the suicide of Thomas Gleadowe-Newcomen in 1825. It later housed a school managed by headmaster William Oulton Prosser in the latter eighteenth century. The castle defence wing to the south and east is reputed to have been destroyed by fire. Ballyfermot House, known locally as 'the tiled house', was built by the Verveer family. In his A Topographical Dictionary of Ireland, Samuel Lewis places a Captain Lampier and his wife Bridget (Cavanaugh of Goldenbridge) as living there in 1834. It stood on the great park to the north of the castle's aquaculture pond. Built in the early eighteenth century, the house had a quirky slated façade in the Dutch style.

The nineteenth century newspaper publisher and writer Joseph Sheridan Le Fanu, proprietor of the Dublin Evening Mail lived in nearby Chapelizod when not in residence his city townhouse at Merrion Square. Ballyfermot and Chapelizod feature in his novel The House by the Churchyard and some of his other works. This large Georgian house still adjoins Church Lane next to St. Laurence's parish churchyard in Chapelizod. The eighteenth-century church, alongside the original medieval bell tower, is still in use. It serves the united parish of Ballyfermot, Palmerstown, and Chapelizod in the Church of Ireland. Le Fanu Road is named after him, as is Le Fanu Park, referred to locally as The Lawns. Le Fanu was a mentor of the writer Bram Stoker author of Dracula, who did the theatre reviews for his newspaper The Dublin Evening Mail.

A short distance from the castle site at the south-east end of Le Fanu Park is a mound which covers the ruins and churchyard of the rectory church of St Laurence. It is believed to have roots in Celtic Christianity, perhaps a minor branch of the Tallaght Maelruain or Kilnamanagh monasteries. It was connected to the Knights of St John of Jerusalem at Kilmainham in the thirteenth century. The churchyard ruins survived into the nineteen sixties. This church served Ballyfermot and the surrounding townlands into the late seventeenth century.

Among the local people buried here are members of the Newcomen and Barnewall families. Sir Robert Newcomen who died in 1629 and his son Sir Beverley Newcomen, Admiral of Ireland, who died in 1637 while taking soundings at Waterford harbour were buried here. His mother Elizabeth (Barnewall of Drimnagh Castle) who died in 1643 is buried as is his widow Margaret (Usher of Donnybrook Castle). She subsequently married Sir Hubert Adrian-Verveer. The Newcomens, Barons of Newcastle Lyons were influential in Irish governance, military and legal circles. They resided at Ballyfermot Castle. This noble family intermarried with the Barnwalls of Drimnagh, the Plunketts of Malahide and the St Lawrences of Howth. MPs for the Westmeath constituency of Kilbeggan, they also married into the Fitzgeralds of Maynooth, and the Nugents, Husseys, Tuites and Nagles of East and West Meath.

Area manor houses of note include Johnstown House (St John's College), Colepark House, Sarsfield House, Sevenoaks, Floraville, Auburn Villa and Gallanstown House. The Ballyfermot townlands were transferred from the Barony of Newcastle to the Barony of Uppercross in the late nineteenth century, under the Local Government Act of 1898.

The dairy and stud farms of Ballyfermot were acquired by the authorities in the 1930s. They were developed into suburban housing estates needed to alleviate the post war housing shortage. This development, along with estates at Drimnagh, Crumlin, Walkinstown and other pockets in the south city, and Cabra, Finglas and Donnycarney along with smaller pockets in the north city provided modern accommodation to facilitate the Dublin City Council public/private housing programs. Initially leased to waiting lists, these modest high-quality well-constructed homes were sold to their residents, even prior to similar government initiatives in the United Kingdom. The first estate was built in the late 1940s at Ballyfermot Lower. South of Sarsfield House and Ballyfermot Road it was originally called the Sarsfield Estate. The street names reflect this historical theme. Gradually, the adjacent townlands to the south of Ballyfermot Road and north of Grange Cross - Ballyfermot Upper, Blackditch, Cherry Orchard, Raheen and Gallanstown were similarly developed. Johnstown, a townland of Palmerstown, located around Johnstown House (St John's College De La Salle) south of Chapelizod was developed for residential housing. Now divided along the Drumfin/Glenaulin/Sports Park perimeter, the west portion was retained by Palmerstown, while the east portion became the township/electoral district of Drumfin in Dublin City (Local Government Act 1993), and included in postal district Dublin 10.

During the 1970s Ballyfermot suffered from a lack of facilities and opportunities for its residents; however, these conditions have improved over time.

Politics
In local government elections Ballyfermot is part of the Ballyfermot-Drimnagh Ward. Since the local elections in 2019, the local elected representatives on Dublin City Council are:
 Vincent Jackson (Independent)
 Daithí de Róiste (Fianna Fáil)
 Hazel de Nortúin (People Before Profit)
 Sophie Nicoullaud (Green Party)
 Daithí Doolan (Sinn Féin)

Ballyfermot is part of the Dublin South-Central Dáil constituency.

Commerce 
The area is now a centre of national commercial distribution, with access to the national trunk roads.  Ballyfermot is bordered to the north by the N4, to the south by the N7 and to the west by the M50.

A number of Irish motor distributors are based in Ballyfermot. They include Toyota, Nissan, General Motors, J. C. Bamford (JCB), Harris Assembly and Hilux. They are centred around Kylemore Road, home to companies such as Thornton's Recycling, C&C, FBD, and Royal Liver Insurance. The industrial estates include Park West and JFK.

There are several hotels in the area, including Days Hotel at Park West and Sheldon Park on Kylemore and Bewleys at Newlands. A community based CCTV monitoring scheme for Ballyfermot was launched in early 2003. This is part of the Department of Justice Town Centre CCTV monitoring initiative.

Transport 
Currently, Dublin Bus (routes G1, G2, 60) and Go-Ahead Ireland (routes 76, 76A, 18) serve the area. An hourly commuter train service is offered by Irish Rail, to Heuston station at Kingsbridge.  The local station is Cherry Orchard/Park West Station, which is located on the Park West Road on the western perimeter of Ballyfermot. A proposed Dublin Metro route passes to the south. The Luas light rail system also serves Ballyfermot. The south side stop is near the Kylemore and Naas Road intersection. A Luas line to Lucan proposes passing through the centre of Ballyfermot village before going on to serve Liffey Valley and Lucan village.

Amenities

Parks
The California Hills Park (also known as Glenaulin Park) is the largest recreational space in the area. The name originated as a colloquialism - there were few designated play facilities in the very early days of suburban development and the California Hills was the name used by local movie-going kids who played 'Cowboys and Indians' there. The name later achieved official recognition due to popular usage. The park covers part of the great esker east of Dublin, and overlooks the Liffey Valley from the south. From Le Fanu and Kylemore Roads to the east, it falls to the landscaped valley of a Liffey tributary, the Glenaulin Stream. It runs west toward Glenaulin and Drumfin Roads which adjoin the park as it stretches in a crescent through Palmerstown. The Chapelizod Bypass runs northwest alongside and Kylemore Road joins the motorway near the West County Hotel. California Hills Park has views north over the Strawberry Beds to the Phoenix Park and the Farmleigh clock tower at Castleknock is a prominent landmark. California Hills include's Gales-Drumfinn Avenue Park, known locally as "The Gaels", used for football, golf practice, cross country runs and walks and includes a children's play area. There is an entrance to the park beside the Ballyfermot Leisure Co-Op, near the GAA Sports Park, on Gurteen Road.

The magnificent Irish National War Memorial, Memorial Gardens and Park, designed by Sir Edwin Lutyens, are accessible from the Sarsfield Road via East Timor Park (Confusingly also referred to by locals as "The Gaels" due to the local GAA club which is attached to the park).

Other parks located in the area include Le Fanu Park, Glenaulin Sports Park, Markievicz Park (also known as the Match Box by some older residents), and Cherry Orchard Park. Cherry Orchard Park area is the proposed site for a new "Village Centre". Le Fanu Park houses the Ballyfermot Leisure Centre and The Base.

Grand Canal
The Grand Canal was constructed in the late eighteenth and early nineteenth centuries. It is now a recreational waterway. It passes along the south side of Ballyfermot. Towpath walkways extend continuously to Hazelhatch, County Kildare. A historic bridge crosses the canal near the seventh lock at Killeen.

Medical facilities
Cherry Orchard Hospital is a public health facility which has a containment laboratory capable of testing for the deliberate release of Bacillus anthracis.

The Ballyfermot Medical Clinic is closed but a new Primary Care and Mental Health Centre has been opened beside Cherry Orchard Hospital. Services include GP, Community Nursing, Physiotherapy, Dental, addiction and community welfare. Mental Health facilities include a day hospital, day centre and outpatients clinic. This is run by the HSE.

The Hermitage Medical Clinic is located in close proximity to the Liffey Valley Shopping Centre, just off the N4 motorway. The Hermitage Hospital is a 101-bed private facility with specialised medical teams who  provide medical, surgical and advanced radiotherapy care to patients. The hospital is privately run. Its principal investors are Sean Mulryan, Larry Goodman, John Flynn and George Duffy GP.

Public institutions
Cloverhill Courthouse and Remand Centre is located between Clondalkin, Palmerstown, and Ballyfermot in Dublin 10. Wheatfield Prison is located on the same site adjacent to the Courthouse.

Education 
National (primary) schools serving the area include Mary Queen of Angels National School, St Louise's Junior & Senior National Schools, Dominican School Campus (which includes St Michael's, St Raphael's and St Gabriel's N.S), and St Ultan's National School.

Secondary schools in Ballyfermot include Kylemore College, St John's College De La Salle, Dominican Convent Secondary School, and Caritas College.

Ballyfermot College of Further Education is a third-level institution based locally.

A fictional "Ballyfermot School" was created for the children's television programme Roy and many of the episodes were set there.

Social and cultural 

The Ballyfermot Community Festival takes place annually.

The Gala was a local auditorium and bingo venue until its closure in the 2010s. The Gala opened in 1953, and saw a number of recreational uses, including as a local cinema and concert venue. The 'De La Salle Boy's Band', founded by Brother Victor F.S.C., played under the baton of bandmaster Brother Cyprian F.S.C. at the annual Christmas 'Rocking Spotlight Concert' at the Gala.

The Ritz Ballroom at Grange Cross was a nearby venue in the early rock and roll era. Bands which played the venue included John Hardy's Blue Clavons and The Melochords featuring Dickie Rock. Some of the young musicians who played here were graduates of the De La Salle music programme and played with the 'De La Salle Boy's Band'. The local 'Young Shadows' and the 'Casino Showband' (later the Indians) made their national debut live on RTÉ's Showband Show.

Ballyfermot Youth Service (BYS) is a youth service that has been running since 1985. BYS provides services to young people of the area including outdoor education programmes, drop-in information centres, music and arts programmes, access to the European Youth in Action programme and a Drugs Peer Education programme. St Mary's Youth Club is based in a building opposite Spar on Claddagh Green. The youth club has been opened since 1958. There is also a drama group for children aged 5 and upwards.

The Civic Centre shares space with the Ballyfermot Residents Association (BRA). St Matthew's Community Centre is located adjacent to St Matthew's Church in Ballyfermot Upper (west). Ballyfermot Public Library serves the area.

Sport

Association football (soccer)
The Cherry Orchard Football Club takes part in the FAI Cup soccer competition. A number of players who started with this team have gone on to play professional soccer in the English Premiership and its associated divisions. Soccer players Andy Reid, William Flood, Alan Quinn and Glenn Whelan all played for Cherry Orchard. Ballyfermot United FC shares the origins of Cherry Orchard FC. The Ballyfermot United FC Social Club is located close to Le Fanu Park. Other clubs include the Black Diamonds, Drummfin Celtic, C.I.E. Ranch, O.L.V, Clifden Celtic and the more recently formed Orchard Celtic. Orchard Celtic's under-twelves team have won the double in their second year. The under-14s won The Hollywood Cup in 2011. Professional football club, St Patrick's Athletic who play in the League of Ireland are located in nearby Inchicore, and Ballyfermot has a large number of Saints fans.

GAA
There are two senior Gaelic Athletic Association clubs serving Ballyfermot. Ballyfermot De la Salle GAA Club is the only GAA club active in the actual area of Ballyfermot, with Liffey Gaels GAA clubhouse based at the border of Ballyfermot and Inchicore and serves the parish of Inchicore.

Ballyfermot De La Salle is the largest Gaelic football club in the area. They originated in 1953 as Ballyfermot Gaels. They play their senior home games in the Drumfin/Glenaulin Sports Park, located on the west side of California Hills Park. They have a pitch in the California Hills where the under 14s team play their home games, and a pitch in the Markievicz Park where the u12s boys and U14s girls teams play their matches. All the teams train at their main pitch in The Gaels (Glenaulin Park). The juvenile teams used to train and play juvenile fixtures at the facilities located behind the De La Salle Primary Schools on Ballyfermot Road, until it was sold for re-development. The club plays in the Kerry colours as a tribute to the first parish priest, Kerryman Charles Canon Troy, who sponsored the club.

Another club, Liffey Gaels, was founded in 1951. It was known as Rialto Gaels for over twenty years. In the 1970s it changed its name to SS. Michael and James's to reflect the efforts of the teachers and students of these schools in the development of the club. In 1984, a local juvenile club, Donore Iosagain, amalgamated with SS. Michael and James's and the club was renamed the Liffey Gaels. Today their immediate catchment area is Inchicore and the parishes of St Michael's, St James’, St Catherine's, Rialto and Donore Avenue. The Gaels play their home games Liffeyside at East Timor Park on Sarsfield Road in Inchicore.

Boxing
St Matthew's Boxing Club is located on Drumfinn Road adjacent to the grounds of Mary Queen of Angels National School, close to Ballyfermot Garda Station. Cherry Orchard Boxing Club was founded by volunteers in 2012 to cope with the demand for the sport in the area after the summer Olympics. The club used facilities in the Orchard Community Center, Cherry Orchard Grove until a permanent home for the club was built with the help of Dublin City Council on the site.

Equestrian 
Cherry Orchard Equine Centre is an equine, education and training centre that offers a number of services to the local area located at Cherry Orchard Green, Ballyfermot. One of the main services it provides is horse riding lessons for children and adults in the community. It was established in 2001 in response to children not attending school in order to tend to the horses kept in Ballyfermot. The problem of horses being kept in the Dublin suburb has spanned generations despite lack of proper facilities and horsemanship knowledge. This centre was established in order to combat this issue and provide people with the skills required to care for a horse.

Other sports
The Pigeon Club near Sarsfield Park reflects a local tradition.

Rugby, badminton, martial arts, snooker, pool, bowling, squash, handball, racquetball, indoor go-karting, tennis, pitch and putt, fishing, boules, rock-climbing, River Liffey rowing, and table tennis are all represented by local clubs.

Leisure centres
Ballyfermot Leisure Centre is located on Le Fanu Road. Ballyfermot Leisure Co-Op (BLCO) is located on Gurteen Road adjacent to Mary Queen of Angels National School. Liffey Valley Fitness is located on the Colcut Road. Sheldon Park Fitness Centre is located on the Kylemore Road. SanoVitae Health and Fitness Club is located in the Clarion Hotel complex close to the Liffey Valley Shopping Centre. The Little Gym is also located in the Clarion Hotel complex.

Religion
Religious institutions serving the area include the Roman Catholic Church of Our Lady of the Assumption (sometimes shorted to 'Church of the Assumption') and the Church of St Matthew, St Laurence's Church, Chapelizod (Church of Ireland), and a number of Christian Evangelist denominations.

Notable people
 Ian Bermingham, footballer with the all time record appearances for St Patrick's Athletic.
 Karen Byrne, Professional Dancer known for her appearances on Dancing with the Stars (Irish TV Series)
 Mary Byrne is a local singer who, in 2010, appeared on the British version of The X Factor.
 Joe Duffy, an Irish broadcaster, was raised in Ballyfermot
 Willo Flood, former professional footballer who played for Manchester City and Celtic.
 The Fureys, a traditional Irish music family, grew up locally and began their professional career while living in Ballyfermot. Their father Ted Furey was a traditional fiddler, a music teacher, and a member of Comhaltas Ceoltori Éireann.
 Jonny Hayes, Republic of Ireland international footballer that also played for Celtic.
 Lorraine Keane, Irish broadcaster and journalist studied broadcasting and journalism at Ballyfermot College.
 Fiach Moriarty; the singer-songwriter grew up in the area
 Declan O'Rourke, the Irish/Australian singer-songwriter, has family connections with Ballyfermot.
 Liam Weldon, sean-nós singer and songwriter, born and grew up in the Liberties but lived for most of his life in Ballyfermot.

References

Further reading
  A history of the County of Dublin Part IV (1906, F. Elrington Ball)
  A Topographical Dictionary Of Ireland (1837 Samuel Lewis)

External links

Towns and villages in South Dublin (county)
Places in South Dublin (county)
Civil parishes of Uppercross